Hot Cup of Talk is the second stand-up comedy special by stand-up comedian Kathy Griffin on HBO.

Track listing

Personnel

Technical and production
Scott Butler - associate producer
Sandy Chanley - producer
Michael D. Jones - production manager
Brian Hall - production coordinator
Doug Ramsey - technical director

Visuals and imagery
Marc Lamphear - film editor 
Alex Fuller - art director

References

External links
Kathy Griffin's Official Website

Kathy Griffin albums
Stand-up comedy albums
1998 live albums